One Man Show is a 2001 Indian Malayalam-language comedy-drama film directed by Shafi (in his directorial debut) and written by the Rafi Mecartin duo. It stars Jayaram, Samyuktha Varma, Lal, Manya, Kalabhavan Mani and Narendra Prasad. The story unfurls itself in the course of a TV game show. this film was a huge commercial success at the box office.

Plot
Jayakrishnan, the protagonist, comes to take part in a show, "One Man Show" hosted by popular movie star Mukesh. During the course of the show, the host pries into Jayakrishnan's past and the whole story is unwound in a flashback.

Jayakrishnan, his uncle K. R. Menon and his cousin (Menon's daughter) Radhika, who is also Jayakrishnan's sweetheart, live together. They are lawyers by profession and their house is nicknamed "Kodathi Veedu" (Court house). Among the lawyers of Kodathi Veedu, Jayakrishnan and his Junior Ponnappan are the only utter. No client ever comes for Jayakrishnan and hence is unable to earn anything. However, he decideds that he'd marry Radhika only after he has fought and won a legal battle. So Jayakrishnan and Ponnappan decide to reopen the case of Hari Narayanan, who has been in a mental asylum for the past few years. Jayakrishnan, with timely help from Doctor Raziya, his friend, proves in court that Hari Narayanan is not insane and that he was dubbed a mad man by his own brother Raveendran, who wanted to wrest his assets. Uncle Menon fights the suit on the defendant's side, but Jayakrishnan wins the lawsuit. Hari Narayanan is released from the mental asylum and Jayakrishnan gets married to Radhika.

But the plot takes a sharp turn when Jayakrishnan discovers that Hari Narayanan is in fact insane. Jayakrishnan is helpless as he is ashamed to expose Hari Narayanan's insanity. Meanwhile, the insane Hari Narayanan thinks that it is him who has married Radhika.  A series of strange incidents take place after which everyone believe that it is Jayakrishnan who is insane. Meanwhile, Hari Narayanan begins to seek revenge on his brother. He bombs his brother's factory, which causes a huge financial loss. Since tt was Radhika who legally offered bail for Hari Narayanan, she is held responsible to cover the loss. They are unable to pay this amount and Radhika goes to prison. It is for her release that Jayakrishnan has come to the TV game show. Everything ends well when he wins the game show and frees his sweetheart.

Cast 
 Jayaram as Adv. Jayakrishnan
 Samyuktha Varma as Adv. Radhika Menon
 Lal as Harinarayanan
 Kalabhavan Mani as Adv. Ponnappan
 Manya as Dr. Raziya Muhammed
 Narendra Prasad as Adv. K. R. Menon
 Janardhanan as Raveendran 
 Salim Kumar as Bhaskaran
 N. F. Varghese as Dr. Nambiar
 Indrans as Achuthan
 Cochin Haneefa as Prem
 Machan Varghese as Pankajakshan
 T. P. Madhavan as Doctor
 Kalabhavan Navas as Shahjahan
 V. K. Sreeraman as Raziya's Father
 Ramu as Jailor
 Manka Mahesh (voice by Anandavally)
 Radhika as Aswathi
 Mukesh as himself, host of the game One Man Show
 Renjith K R as a mental patient

Remakes
The film was remade in Tamil as Kalakkura Chandru (2007).

Soundtrack 
The songs in this movie has been written by Kaithapram Damodaran Namboothiri as has been given music by Suresh Peters. The music has been distributed by Sathyam Audios.

 "Pavizhamalar Penkodi": M. G. Sreekumar, K. S. Chithra
 "Rosappoo Rosappoo": M. G. Sreekumar, K. S. Chithra
 "Kasithumba": P. Unnikrishnan, Swarnalatha
 "Adyathe": P. Jayachandran
 "Rakkadambil": M. G. Sreekumar, Mano
 "Oru Mulam": Srinivas, Sujatha Mohan
 "Neelaravil": M. G. Sreekumar
 "Niramazhayil": Mano, Sujatha Mohan, Suresh Peters, Chorus
 "Kasithumba Poove": P. Unnikrishnan

References

External links
 

2001 films
2000s Malayalam-language films
Malayalam films remade in other languages
Films scored by Suresh Peters
Films directed by Shafi